There Will Come a Day is the second studio album by Canadian country music artist Shirley Myers. It was released by Stony Plain Records on June 8, 1999. The album produced the Top Ten singles "Forever in Love," "You Better Be Sure" and "I'm Missin' You."

Track listing
"You Better Be Sure" – 4:03
"I'm Missin' You" – 3:49
"You Left Me" – 4:28
"Do You Love Me" – 2:44
"I Give Up" – 3:09
"I'll Still Be Holding You" – 3:35
"Forever in Love" – 3:27
duet with Duane Steele
"Real True Love" – 3:45
"Why Can't It Be You" – 4:41
"Saturday Night" – 2:59
"There Will Come a Day" – 4:52
"The French Song" – 2:55

Chart performance

External links
[ There Will Come a Day] at Allmusic

1999 albums
Shirley Myers albums
Albums produced by Keith Olsen
Stony Plain Records albums